This article is part of the history of rail transport by country series

The history of rail transport in Madagascar began at the start of the twentieth century, with the construction of a metre gauge line between Brickaville (now Ampasimanolotra) and Madagascar's capital, Tananarive (now Antananarivo).  That line was the first section of the Tananarive–Côte Est railway (TCE) from Tananarive to Toamasina, the country's chief seaport.  It eventually became the nucleus of a network of three railways, the Network North.

Between 1926 and 1936, an isolated line, the Fianarantsoa-Côte Est railway (FCE), was built, again in metre gauge, in the south east of the island.  The FCE is also known as Southern Network (French: Réseau Sud).

The two separate networks were combined under the same management in 1944.  The whole system was nationalized in 1974.  By the 1990s, the national system was very run down, and the Malagasy government decided to privatize it.  Since 2003, Network North has been run by a joint stock company, Madarail, under a 25-year concession, while the Southern network had remained under parastatal operation.
In 2022 the private investors desisted and the company is now 100% owned by the state of Madagascar.

Madagascar has also had a number of industrial railways, including a line serving a sugar cane plantation on the small island of Nosy Be, north west of the main island.

The line from Antananarivo to Antsirabe (159 km) was closed in the mid-1990th after the passage of the Cyclone Ana that damaged a bridge over the river Sasaony.
Reopening is projected for 2023 only as earlier governements found more urgent utilities for the funds.

See also

History of Madagascar
Rail transport in Madagascar

References

External links

Madagascar
Rail
Rail transport in Madagascar

de:Schienenverkehr auf Madagaskar#Geschichte
no:Jernbane på Madagaskar#Historie
ru:Железнодорожный транспорт на Мадагаскаре#История